The Johor Zoo is a -wide zoo in Johor Bahru, Johor, Malaysia with more than 100 animal species in the zoo displayed in 28 exhibits such as gorillas, elephants, flamingos, horses and lions. It is located 1 km from Johor Bahru City Centre and is the only zoo administered by a state government in Malaysia.

The zoo was opened in 1928 by His Royal Highness Almarhum Sultan Sir Ibrahim Ibni Almarhum Sultan Sir Abu Bakar and named as the Kebun Binatang, which is Malay for Animal Garden, or zoo and was the first of its kind in Southeast Asia at that time. On 1 April 1962, the zoo was handed over to Johor State Government and opened to the public that same year.

Transportation
The zoo is accessible by Muafakat Bus route P-101.

See also
 List of tourist attractions in Malaysia

References

External links

 Facebook - ZOO JOHOR

1928 establishments in British Malaya
Buildings and structures in Johor Bahru
Tourist attractions in Johor
Zoos established in 1928
Zoos in Malaysia